Tarun Bose (14 September 1928 – 8 March 1972) was an Indian actor, active in Bollywood during the 1960s and 1970s.

Early life and education
Bose was born in Kolkata, though he grew up in Nagpur, where he studied at St. Francis High School. Early in his teen he started performing a local plays and at age 15 he auditioned for the newly opened All India Radio, Nagpur, where he went on to work in radio plays.

Career
After completing his education, he started working with the Post and Telegraph Department, so that he could pursue acting on the side, without any family pressure.

Bose made his film debut in 1957 in the Asit Sen film, Apradhi Kaun? (1957), which also starred Mala Sinha and Abhi Bhattacharya. His acting in Bimal Roy's Sujata (1959) was appreciated, where he was cast with Nutan, Sunil Dutt and Sulochana.

Bose was noted for his intense performances in movies such as Gumnaam, Bandini (1963), Anupama (1966), Devar, Mujhe Jeene Do (1963), Aan Milo Sajna and several other movies in the sixties and early seventies. He has worked with eminent actors such as Ashok Kumar, Dharmendra, Manoj Kumar, Sunil Dutt, Balraj Sahni and Amitabh Bachchan among others. From the directors, he has worked with Bimal Roy, Hrishikesh Mukherjee, Satyen Bose, Asit Sen, Dulal Guha and others.

He starred in at least 41 films between 1957 and 1972 and gained a reputation for playing middle class professional figures, particularly doctors and occasionally judges or lawyers. He died on 8 March 1972.

Filmography

 Apradhi Kaun? (1957)
 Madhumati (1958)
 Sujata (1959)
 Usne Kaha Tha (1960)
 Shama (1961)
 Begaana (1963)
 Bandini (1963)
 Mujhe Jeene Do (1963)
 Kohra (1964)
 Akashdeep (1965)
 Faraar (1965)
 Gumnaam (1965)
 Oonche Log (1965)
 Bhaiyaa (1965)
 Devar (1966)
 Anupama (1966)
 Love in Tokyo (1966)
 Pyar Mohabbat (1966)
 Chhoti Si Mulaqat (1967)
 Jaal (1967)
 Anokhi Raat (1968)
 Jyoti (1969)
 Dharti Kahe Pukarke (1969)
 Insaaf Ka Mandir (1969)
 Satyakam (1969)
Maharaja (1970 film)
 Ganwaar (1970)
 Gunah Aur Kanoon (1970)
 Aan Milo Sajna (1970)
 Jeevan Sangram (1974)

References

External links
 
 

Indian male film actors
Male actors in Hindi cinema
1972 deaths
1928 births
20th-century Indian male actors
Male actors from Nagpur
Male actors from Kolkata